Indira Gandhi International Airport  is the primary international airport serving Delhi, the capital of India, and the National Capital Region (NCR). Named after Indira Gandhi (1917–1984), a former Prime Minister of India, it is the busiest airport of India in terms of passenger traffic since 2009. It is also the busiest airport in the country in terms of cargo traffic, overtaking Mumbai during late 2015. In the financial year of 2020, the airport handled 67.3 million passengers, the highest ever in the airport's history. As of 2022, it is the seventh busiest airport in the world, as per the latest rankings issued by the UK-based air consultancy firm, OAG. It is the second busiest airport in the world by seating capacity, having a seating capacity of over 3.6 million seats, and the busiest airport in Asia by passenger traffic, handling over 37 million passengers in 2021.

The airport was operated by the Indian Air Force before its management was transferred to the Airports Authority of India. In May 2006, the management of the airport was passed over to Delhi International Airport Limited (DIAL), a consortium led by the GMR Group. In September 2008, the airport inaugurated a  runway. With the commencement of operations at Terminal 3 in 2010, it became India's and South Asia's largest aviation hub. The Terminal 3 building has a capacity to handle 34 million passengers annually and was the world's 8th largest passenger terminal upon completion. The airport uses an advanced system called Airport Collaborative Decision Making (A-CDM) to help keep takeoffs and landings timely and predictable.

The other airport serving NCR is the Hindon Airport, which is much smaller in size and primarily handles regional flights out of the city under the UDAN Scheme. The former airport, which used to be the primary airport of NCR, Safdarjung Airport is now used mainly by VVIP helicopters and small charter helicopters due to its short runway. To stimulate the increasing traffic, a second airport, Noida International Airport is being constructed to offset the load of Indira Gandhi International Airport.

History

Safdarjung Airport was built in 1930 and was the main airport for Delhi until 1962. Due to increasing passenger traffic at Safdarjung, civilian operations were moved to Palam Airport (later renamed to IGIA) in 1962. Palam Airport had been built during World War II and after the British departed from India, it served as an Air Force Station for the Indian Air Force.

Palam Airport had a peak capacity of around 1,300 passengers per hour. In 1979–80, a total of 3 million domestic and international passengers flew into and out of Palam Airport. Owing to an increase in air traffic in the 70s and the 80's, an additional terminal with nearly four times the area of the old Palam terminal was constructed. With the inauguration of this new international terminal, Terminal 2, on 2 May 1986, the airport was renamed as Indira Gandhi International Airport (IGIA).

The old domestic airport (Palam) is known as Terminal 1 and was divided into separate buildings – 1A, 1B, and 1C. Blocks 1A and 1B were used to handle international operations while domestic operations took place in Block 1C. Block 1A and 1B later became dedicated terminals for domestic airlines and are currently closed down. It is planned that they will be demolished after the construction of newer terminals. Block 1C was also turned into a domestic arrivals terminal, and was rebuilt and opened on February 24, 2022. The newly constructed domestic departures block 1D is now used by all domestic low-cost airlines (IndiGo, and SpiceJet). There is also a separate technical area for VIP passengers. The domestic arrivals terminal 1C was demolished and rebuilt into a brand-new domestic arrivals terminal. For this expansion work, GoAir and select flights of IndiGo were moved to Terminal 2 as well as select flights of SpiceJet and IndiGo to Terminal 3.

The Delhi Airport gained a nonstop flight to North America in October 2001, when an Airbus A340 belonging to Canada 3000 touched down from Toronto. Even though the 11 September attacks had precipitated a global decline in air travel, Canada 3000 proceeded with launching the route, hoping it would help improve the airline's financial position. The opening of Russian airspace after the Cold War allowed pilots to fly over the Arctic, thereby reducing the flight duration. Nevertheless, Canada 3000 collapsed just one month after the service began.

Significant growth in the Indian aviation industry led to a major increase in passenger traffic. The capacity of Terminal 1 was estimated to be 7.15 million passengers per annum (mppa). The actual throughput for 2005/06 was an estimated 10.4 million passengers. Including the then closed down international terminal (Terminal 2), the airport had a total capacity of 12.5 million passengers per year, whereas the total passenger traffic in 2006/07 was 16.5 million passengers per year. In 2008, the total passenger count at the airport reached 23.97 million. To ease the traffic congestion on the existing terminals, a much larger Terminal 3 was constructed and inaugurated on 3 July 2010. The new terminal's construction took 37 months for completion and this terminal increased the airport's total passenger capacity by 34 million. Apart from the three budget domestic airlines handled by Terminals 1 and 2, all other airlines operate their flights from Terminal 3. On 1 June 2022, Delhi International Airport became India's first to run entirely on Hydro Power and solar energy. On 16 December 2022, IGI Airport installed 5 new x-ray machines at the security-check area, taking the total to 18 ATRS/x-ray machines.

Ownership 
On 31 January 2006, the aviation minister Praful Patel announced that the empowered Group of Ministers have agreed to sell the management-rights of Delhi Airport to the DIAL consortium and the Mumbai Airport to the GVK Group. On 2 May 2006, the management of Delhi and Mumbai airports were handed over to the private consortia. Delhi International Airport Limited (DIAL) is a consortium of the GMR Group (54% (currently 64%)), Fraport (10%) and Malaysia Airports (10% (currently no share)), and the Airports Authority of India retains a 26% stake.

Nine years later, in May 2015, Malaysia Airports chose to exit from DIAL venture and sold its entire 10% stake to majority shareholder GMR Infra for $79 million. Following this GMR Group's stake at DIAL increased to 64%. Earlier, GMR indicated that it was interested in buying out the 10% stake of Fraport.

Facilities

Runways

Delhi Airport has three near-parallel runways: runway 11R/29L,  with a CAT IIIB instrument landing system (ILS) on both sides, runway 10/28, and runway 09/27, . The 09/27 runway of the Delhi Airport was the airport's first-ever runway; the British constructed the 2,816 metre-long and 60 metre-wide runway in the pre-independence era and used it during World War II. In addition to Chaudhary Charan Singh International Airport in Lucknow and Jaipur Airport in Jaipur, Delhi Airport is the only airport in India to have been equipped with the CAT III-B ILS, as of 2017. In the winter of 2005, there were a record number of disruptions at Delhi Airport due to fog/smog. Since then some domestic airlines have trained their pilots to operate under CAT-II conditions of a minimum  visibility. On 31 March 2006, IGI became the first Indian airport to operate two runways simultaneously following a test run involving a SpiceJet plane landing on runway 28 and a Jet Airways plane taking off from runway 27 at the same time.

The initially proposed mode involving simultaneous takeoffs in westerly flow to increase handling traffic capacity caused several near misses over the west side of the airport where the centrelines of runways 10/28 and 9/27 intersect. The runway use was changed to segregate dependent mode on 25 December 2007, which was a few days after a near miss involving an Airbus A330-200 of Qatar Airways and an IndiGo A320 aircraft. The new method involved the use of runway 28 for all departures and runway 27 for all arrivals. This more streamlined model was adopted during day hours (– 2300 0600 – 2300 IST) until 24 September 2008.

The runway increases the airport's capacity to handle up to 100 flights from the previous 45–60 flights per hour. The new runway was opened for commercial operations on 25 September 2008 and gradually began full round-the-clock operations by the end of October of the same year.

Since 2012, all three runways are operated simultaneously to handle traffic during day hours. Only runways 11R/29L and 10/28 are operated during night (2300–0600 IST) hours with single runway landing restriction during westerly traffic flow that is rotated late night (0300 IST) and reversed weekly to distribute and mitigate night time landing noise over nearby residential areas.

To cater for the demand of increasing air traffic, the master plan for the construction of a fourth parallel runway next to the existing runway 11R/29L has been cleared. It is expected to be completed by early 2023.

Terminals

IGI Airport serves as a major hub or a focus destination for several Indian carriers including Air India, Air India Regional, IndiGo, SpiceJet, GoAir, and Vistara. Approximately 80 airlines serve this airport. At present, there are three actively scheduled passenger terminals, as well as a cargo terminal.

Recently, Delhi Airport operator DIAL has introduced an e-boarding facility for passengers at all the three terminals of the airport, by which all boarding gates will have contactless e-boarding gates with boarding card scanners, which will allow passengers to flash their physical or e-boarding cards to verify flight details in order to proceed for security checks.

Domestic and international operations
Terminal 3 is an integrated terminal used for both international and domestic flights. The Indian carriers operating international flights are Air India, IndiGo, SpiceJet, GoAir, and Vistara.

As far as domestic operations are concerned, Terminal 3 is used by Air India, AirAsia India, Vistara, and select flights of SpiceJet and IndiGo.

GoAir and select flights of IndiGo use Terminal 2 for their domestic operations.

Terminal 1
Terminal 1 is currently used by the low cost domestic carriers, such as SpiceJet and IndiGo. In 2022, Terminal 1D was fully expanded with an arrivals hall, with the goal of enhancing its annual passenger handling capacity from the previous 18 million to 30 million.

Terminal 1A

Terminal 1A was built in the late 1980s to cater to Indian Airlines (now absorbed into Air India). It had to be refurbished after a fire gutted the interiors and DIAL significantly upgraded the terminal. It was used by Air India for its Airbus operations until it shifted to the new Terminal 3 on 11 November 2010. This terminal is now closed and is expected to be torn down on the completion of newer terminals.

Terminal 1B

Terminal 1B was also built in the late 1980s and was used only for domestic departures. Upon the opening of the new domestic departures Terminal 1D in 2009, Terminal 1B got closed and is also expected to be torn down on the completion of newer terminals.

Terminal 1C
Terminal 1C was also built in the late 1980s and was used only for domestic arrivals. The terminal has been upgraded with a newly expanded greeting area and a larger luggage reclaim area with eight belts. Terminal 1C was shut down, torn, and rebuilt into a brand new domestic arrivals hall on 24 February 2022.

Terminal 1D

Terminal 1D commenced operations on 19 April 2009. It has 72 Common Use Terminal Equipment (CUTE) enabled check-in counters, 16 self check-in counters, and 16 security channels.

Terminal 2
Terminal 2 was opened on 1 May 1986, at a cost of 95 crores and was used for international flights until July 2010 when operations shifted to Terminal 3. After this, the terminal remained operational for only three months per year catering to Hajj flights. In 2017, after revamping Terminal 2 at a cost of 100 crores, DIAL shifted all operations of GoAir and select operations of IndiGo to that terminal in order to continue expansion work of Terminal 1.

Terminal 3

Designed by HOK working in consultation with Mott MacDonald, the new Terminal 3 is a two-tier building spread over an area of 5.4     million square feet (approx 502,000 square metre ) making it the world's 8th largest terminal in the world, with the lower floor being the arrivals area, and the upper floor being a departures area. This terminal has 168 check-in counters, 78 aerobridges at 48 contact stands, 54 parking bays, 95 immigration counters, 18 X-ray screening areas, shorter waiting times, duty-free shops, and other features. This new terminal was timed to be completed for the 2010 Commonwealth Games, which was held in Delhi and is connected to Delhi by an eight-lane Delhi-Gurgaon Expressway and the Delhi Metro through its Airport Express (Orange Line). The terminal was officially inaugurated on 3 July 2010. All international airlines shifted their operations to the new terminal in late July 2010 and all full service domestic carriers in November 2010. The arrival area is equipped with 14 baggage carousels. Terminal 3 has India's first automated parking management and guidance system in a multi level car park, which comprises seven levels and a capacity of 4,300 cars. Terminal 3 forms the first phase of the airport expansion which tentatively includes the construction of additional passenger & cargo terminals (Terminal 4, 5, and 6).

Domestic full-service airlines operate from Terminal 3 including Air India, the national carrier. The Tata & Singapore Airlines airline joint-venture Vistara also operates from Terminal 3. AirAsia India, although a low cost airline, also operates its domestic flights from this terminal. Some flights of SpiceJet and IndiGo were also shifted to Terminal 3 temporarily for the expansion of Terminal 1.

WorldMark is an upcoming mixed-use project in the Aerocity hospitality district near Terminal 3.

General Aviation Terminal
India's first general aviation terminal was commissioned in this airport in September 2020. The terminal caters to support the movement and processing of passengers flying through chartered flights or private jets from the airport.

Air cargo complex
It consists of separate brownfield and greenfield cargo terminals. The cargo operations at the brownfield terminal are managed by Celebi Delhi Cargo Management India Pvt. Ltd., which is a joint venture between Delhi International Airport Private Ltd (DIAL) and the Turkish company Celebi Ground Handling (CGH). CGH was awarded the contract to develop, modernise, and finance the existing cargo terminal and to operate the terminal for a period of twenty-five years by DIAL in November 2009. It started its operations in June 2010. In addition to the existing terminal, a new greenfield terminal is being developed in phases by Delhi Cargo Service Centre (DCSC), also a joint venture between DIAL and Cargo Service Center (CSC). The greenfield cargo terminal project consists of two terminals built over a plot of 48,000 square metres and 28,500 square metres, respectively. Phase 1A of the project has been completed and is fully operational. Once the entire project is completed, these two new terminals will have an annual handling capacity of 1.25 million tonnes. The cargo operations of the airport received "e-Asia 2007" award in 2007 for "Implementation of e-Commerce / Electronic Data Interchange in Air Cargo Sector".

Airlines and destinations

Passenger

Cargo

Statistics

Connectivity

Rail
Several passenger trains run regularly between these stations. Shahabad Mohammadpur railway station is equally close.

Terminals 2 and 3 of the airport are served by the IGI Airport metro station on Airport Express (Orange Line) of Delhi Metro. The  line runs from Dwarka Sector 21 to the New Delhi metro station with trains running every 10 minutes. Terminal 1 is served by the Terminal 1-IGI Airport metro station on the Magenta Line.

Road
The airport is connected by the 8-lane Delhi–Gurgaon Expressway, the busiest inter-city route in India. Air conditioned low-floor buses operated by Delhi Transport Corporation (DTC) regularly run between the airport and the city. Metered taxis are also available from Terminals 1 and 3 to all areas of Delhi.

Awards
In 2010, IGIA was conferred the fourth best airport award in the world in the 15–25 million category, and Most Improved Airport in the Indo-Pacific Region by Airports Council International. The airport was rated as the Best Airport in the world in the 25–40 million passengers category in 2015, by Airports Council International. It was awarded The Best Airport in Central Asia and Best Airport Staff in Central Asia at the Skytrax World Airport Awards 2015. It also stood first in the new rankings for 2015 Airport Service Quality (ASQ) Awards conducted by Airports Council International. The airport, along with Mumbai Airport, was adjudged as the "World's Best Airport" at the Airport Service Quality Awards 2017, in the highest category of airports handling more than 40 million passengers annually. The airport was awarded the "best airport" in Asia-Pacific in 2020 (over 40 million passengers per annum) by the Airports Council International. In 2023, the airport was awarded as the Cleanest Airport in the Asia-Pacific Region and also stood first again in the rankings for 2022 Airport Service Quality (ASQ) Awards in the category of over 40 million passengers per annum, conducted by Airports Council International.

Future expansion 
The newer domestic arrivals and departures terminals 1C and 1D, respectively, will be connected and expanded into a singular domestic terminal which will be known as simply, Terminal 1.

Terminals 4, 5, and 6 will be built at a later stage, which will be triggered by growth in passenger traffic. Once completed, all international flights will move to these three new terminals. Terminal 3 will then be solely used for handling domestic air traffic. A new cargo handling building is also planned. According to Delhi International Airport Limited (DIAL), these new terminals will increase the airport's annual passenger volume capacity to 100 million.

DIAL submitted a plan in 2016 to the then aviation secretary R N Choubey regarding the expansion of the airport with a new fourth runway and Terminal 4 in a phased manner. The Master Plan of Airport in 2016 was then reviewed and updated by DIAL in consultation with the Airports Authority of India. The terminal construction will start after the fourth runway is completed and Terminal 1 is expanded.

Accidents and incidents

 1970: The pilot of a Royal Nepal Airlines Fokker F27-200 (9N-AAR) lost control due to severe thunderstorms and downdrafts, crashing just short of the runway. The plane was landing after a flight from Kathmandu, Nepal. Of the five crew and 18 passengers, one crew member was killed.
 1972: Japan Airlines Flight 471 crashed outside of Palam Airport, killing 82 of 87 occupants; ten of eleven crew members and 72 of 76 passengers died, as did three people on the ground.
 1973: Indian Airlines Flight 440 crashed while on approach to Palam Airport, killing 48 of the 65 passengers and crew on board.
 1990: An Air India Boeing 747 flying on the London-Delhi-Mumbai route and carrying 215 people (195 passengers and 20 crew) touched down at Indira Gandhi International Airport after a flight from London Heathrow Airport. On application of reverse thrust, a failure of the no. 1 engine pylon to wing attachment caused this engine to tilt nose down. Hot exhaust gases caused a fire on the left-wing. There were no casualties but the aircraft was damaged beyond repair and written off.
1993: An Uzbekistan Airlines Tupolev Tu-154 that had been leased by Indian Airlines due to an ongoing pilot strike flipped over and caught fire while landing in bad weather. There were no fatalities, but the aircraft was destroyed by a post-crash fire.
 1994: A Sahara Airlines Boeing 737-2R4C (registered VT-SIA) crashed while performing a training flight killing all four people on board and one person on the ground. Wreckage struck an Aeroflot Ilyushin-86 (registered RA-86119) parked nearby, killing four people inside.
 1995: Indian Airlines Flight 492 (IC 492), a Boeing 737-2A8 (Registered VT-ECS), was damaged beyond repair when the aircraft overshot the runway at Delhi Airport due to pilots error, on its scheduled flight from Jaipur to Delhi.
 1996: The airport was involved in the Charkhi Dadri mid-air collision when a Saudia Boeing 747-100B, climbing out after take-off, collided with an incoming Kazakhstan Airlines Ilyushin Il-76 chartered by a fashion company, causing the deaths of all 349 people on board the two planes.
 In December 1999, Indian Airlines Flight 814 bound for Delhi was hijacked. The plane was taken to Pakistan, Afghanistan and the UAE. After the turn of the millennium, the plane was allowed to go back to Delhi. One passenger was killed.

See also
 Transport in India
 List of airports in India
 List of busiest airports in India
 Aviation in India

References

Citations

Bibliography

External links

 Indira Gandhi International Airport, official website
 GMR Delhi International Airport Limited (DIAL)
 

Airports in Delhi
International airports in India
1930 establishments in India
Airports established in 1930
South West Delhi district
Airfields of the United States Army Air Forces Air Transport Command in the China-Burma-India Theater
Airfields of the United States Army Air Forces in British India
Tourism in Delhi
Monuments and memorials to Indira Gandhi
Articles containing video clips
World War II sites in India
20th-century architecture in India